Darreh-ye Na (also Romanized as Darreh-ye Nā; also known as Darehnā) is a village in Saroleh Rural District, Meydavud District, Bagh-e Malek County, Khuzestan Province, Iran. At the 2006 census, its population was 38, in 11 families.

References 

Populated places in Bagh-e Malek County